2010–11 Soeratin Cup is a football competition which is intended for footballers under the age of eighteen. Previously the competition was sponsored by PT Bogasari and competition called Bogasari League.

Soeratin name used as the name for the dedicated this championship trophy as a tribute to one of the main founder and the chairman of the Football Association of Indonesia (PSSI).

The participants of this competition comes from all junior clubs from all board members to thirty-three local football association throughout Indonesia.

First round
First round held at the provincial level and organized by the Regional Committee of the Football Association of Indonesia under the supervision of the Indonesian Amateur League Board.

Second round

The second round is Soeratin Cup competition for territory level are divided based on the home islands participating clubs.

Sumatra Zone

Group I Cubadak Field, Indarung, Padang

Group II Soemantri Brodjonegoro Stadium, Jakarta

Group III Sekayu Stadium, Musi Banyuasin

Group IV Sunter Field, North Jakarta

Java Zone
Group V Bea Cukai Stadium, Rawamangun, Jakarta

Group VI Gajayana Stadium, Malang

Group VII R. Maladi Stadium, Solo

Sulawesi Zone
Group XI Kaligowa Stadium

Lesser Sunda Islands Zone
Group XIII Bea Cukai Stadium, Rawamangun, Jakarta

Third round

Sumatra Zone

Group XVII Sekayu Stadium, Musi Banyuasin, South Sumatra

Group XVIII Sunter Stadium, Jakarta

Java Zone
Group XIX Sriwedari Stadium, Solo, Central Java

Group XX Gajayana Stadium, Malang, East Java

Sulawesi Zone
Group XXI Andi Matalatta Stadium, Makassar, South Sulawesi

Fourth round

Round IV Suratin Cup U-18 2010-11 (round of 16 National).

System: Home Tournament.

Participants: 16 teams.

Group A
H. Agus Salim Stadium, Padang, West Sumatra

Group B
Tugu Stadium, North Jakarta, Jakarta

Group C
Bea Cukai Stadium, Rawamangun, Jakarta

Group D
Karebosi Field, Makassar, South Sulawesi

Fifth round

Round V Suratin Cup U-18 2010-11 (8 Grand National).

System: Home Tournament.

Participants: 8 teams.

Group E
Jatidiri Stadium, Semarang, Central Java

PSM Makassar U-18 crossed out, because the participation of the Senior team PSM in Liga Primer Indonesia competition.

Group F
Tugu Stadium, North Jakarta, Jakarta

Ranking is done through lottery (performed before the final game).

Knockout stage

Semifinals

Final

Champions

References

External links
 Official website of PSSI

2010–11 in Indonesian football
2010-11